Samuel Johnston (born 13 April 1967) is a Scottish former footballer who played as a midfielder for clubs including St Johnstone, Partick Thistle and Glenavon.

Career
Johnston began his professional career as a teenager with St Johnstone, playing over 200 times for the Perth club including the semi-final of the 1988–89 Scottish Cup when the part-time, second tier side took champions-elect Rangers to a replay, and a match described as 'McDiarmid Park's greatest' when closest challengers Airdrieonians were defeated to virtually confirm the 1989–90 Scottish First Division title and promotion to the Premier Division.

Johnston's contribution for the Saints in the top flight consisted of one appearance as a substitute against Dundee United in August 1990 before he quickly returned to the First Division upon being signed by Ayr United. He stayed at Somerset Park for less than a season before switching to Partick Thistle in a swap deal involving Cammy Duncan in March 1991. He was involved in another successful promotion run with the Jags as they finished runners-up in the 1991–92 Scottish First Division, followed by a solid Premier Division campaign in 1992–93, although by then Johnston was out of favour. After departing from Firhill, he had short spells with Ballymena United in Northern Ireland and Stranraer in Scotland, before crossing the Irish Sea for a longer period, playing in the Irish League for Glenavon – where he had a car park fistfight with opponent Pat McAllister, scored in the 1995–96 UEFA Cup and won the Irish Cup in 1997 – and Coleraine, and in the League of Ireland for Finn Harps.

In 1998 he returned to Partick Thistle, now in the third tier, then dropped into the Junior leagues to join Pollok. After retiring from playing, he later managed Neilston Juniors for three years (leading them to the SJFA West Region Premiership) and was assistant to Mark Cameron at Arthurlie.

Personal life
His younger brother Allan (a Scottish international with 18 caps) and nephew Max also played professionally.

See also
List of Scottish football families
List of St Johnstone F.C. players

References

Living people
1967 births
Association football midfielders
Footballers from Glasgow
Scottish footballers
St Johnstone F.C. players
Glenavon F.C. players
Coleraine F.C. players
Ballymena United F.C. players
Finn Harps F.C. players
Scottish expatriate sportspeople in Ireland
Partick Thistle F.C. players
Stranraer F.C. players
Pollok F.C. players
NIFL Premiership players
League of Ireland players
Scottish Football League players
Scottish Junior Football Association players
Scottish Junior Football Association managers
Scottish expatriate footballers
Expatriate association footballers in the Republic of Ireland
Scottish football managers
Neilston Juniors F.C. managers